Larry Rhoden (born February 5, 1959) is an American politician and businessman serving as the 39th lieutenant governor of South Dakota since 2019. 

A Republican, he served as a member of the state house of representatives from 2001 to 2009 and later from 2017 to 2019, and as a member of the state senate from 2009 to 2015. Rhoden was an unsuccessful candidate for U.S. Senate in the 2014 election, where he ran as a conservative opponent in the Republican primary to eventual winner Mike Rounds.

Early life
Rhoden was born and raised on a farm and grew up attending church. After graduating high school, he served in the South Dakota National Guard from 1978 to 1985, carrying on a family legacy of military service that began in the Revolutionary War. While his children were young, he served as a church trustee and earned a seat on the local school board, and led the Board of Directors for the Cenex area. He graduated from Sunshine Bible Academy in 1977.

Career
Rhoden served in the South Dakota House of Representatives from 2001 to 2008, spending four years as majority leader. After being term-limited, Rhoden was elected to the state senate. In 2010, Rhoden ran for senate majority leader, but lost to Russell Olson.

Rhoden served on the Agriculture and Natural Resources committee and the State Affairs committee. He has backed bills to arm volunteers in schools, and sponsored a legislative finding saying that the "Founding Fathers freely and willingly abjured all legislative and executive authority to regulate gun ownership and usage… to individual citizens."

2014 U.S. Senate candidacy 

Rhoden ran for a United States Senate seat in 2014, calling himself a "conservative voice for limited government." Rhoden spoke out against abortion, same-sex marriage, "career politicians," "activist judges," and immigration "amnesty." Rhoden signed a pledge to never raise taxes, and supports de-funding the Patient Protection and Affordable Care Act. 

Rhoden spoke at a conference organized by the conservative organization RedState, criticizing fellow candidate Mike Rounds's position on taxes.  Rounds defeated Rhoden by a margin of 41,377 to 13,393 in the June 2, 2014 primary.

Lieutenant Governor of South Dakota (2019–present)

2018 gubernatorial election

Kristi Noem announced on June 20, 2018, that Rhoden would be her running mate as lieutenant governor. Noem had previously referred to the role of a prospective lieutenant governor, stating that "I would do it a little differently maybe than Daugaard and Michels have done it." She further stated that "I don’t see the lieutenant governor filling as big a role as Michels did. I'm just a believer that there are certain decisions the governor has to make, and so maybe it would be more of a traditional role than what we saw in the last administration."

Tenure 
Rhoden assumed office on January 5, 2019.

On May 5, 2020, Governor Noem announced that South Dakota Secretary of Agriculture Kim Vanneman would be resigning effective May 8, 2020, and that Rhoden was being named interim agriculture secretary.  On August 27, 2020, Governor Noem announced that she was merging the Department of Agriculture and the Department of Environment and Natural Resources which would be called the Department of Agriculture and Natural Resources and be led by Secretary Hunter Roberts, and thereby ending Rhoden's interim role as Ag secretary.

On June 20, 2020, at the Republican State Convention, Rhoden was elected to be one of South Dakota's three Republican Presidential Electors along with Governor Kristi Noem and Attorney General Jason Ravnsborg.

Personal life 
Rhoden lives in Union Center, South Dakota. He and his wife, Sandy, have four children and 4 grand children. Rhoden is a rancher by trade and runs and owns a cow-calf operation and custom welding business.

References

External links
Larry Rhoden at Ballotpedia
Project Vote Smart – Larry Rhoden (SD) profile
Our Campaigns – Larry Rhoden (SD) profile
Official Lieutenant Governor biography

|-

|-

1959 births
2020 United States presidential electors
Lieutenant Governors of South Dakota
Living people
Republican Party members of the South Dakota House of Representatives
People from Meade County, South Dakota
People from Sturgis, South Dakota
Ranchers from South Dakota
Republican Party South Dakota state senators
21st-century American politicians